Rue Barclay (February 23, 1922 – March 6, 1998) was an American Country & Western musician who recorded in the 1940s and in to the 1970s. He was also record producer who produced records for Clarence Jackson, Mutt Poston & The Farm Hands and Red White & The Country Gospel Singers etc.

Career
Barclay had history in recording went back to the late 1940s.

1950s to 1960s
In 1950 he had a 78RPM single "Arizona" bw "Goin' On Down To See Rose"  out on the Webster label. It was credited to Rue Barclay And Lois Reed With The Melody Riders. 
In 1962, Barclay had a release on the Impact label. His release was "I've Lost The Road" bw "Please Dear Won't You Stay". Also that year, a song he co-wrote with Dorinda Morgan for surf band The Tornadoes, "Phantom Surfer " was released on the Aertaun label. The following year Barclay appeared in a low budget film, The Skydivers. He was part of an outfit led by Jimmy Bryant called Jimmy Bryant and the Night Jumpers. Two songs by the group, "Stratosphere Boogie" and "Ah-So" were featured in the film.  It was reported in the November 30, 1968 edition of Record World that Barclay was to produce all of the sessions for (husband and wife duo), John & Sharon Leighton who were signed to Sage and Sand Records.
Also, in the late 1960s, he was working in promotion for the Reena record label in California.

1970s
By 1973, Barclay was running the booking agency for Adkorp. He produced a single for Bob Correll "Piano Man" bw "Don't Knock It "Until You Try It", released on Vistone 2069. Also for the same label, he produced a single for Frank Fara, "Lost Between Yesterday And Today" bw "Donner Pass", released on the Vistone 2074 in 1975.

Discography

References

External links
 Rue Barclay productions at Hank Williams Snr. Listings
 Rue Barclay Writing & Arrangement, Conducting & Leading and Production at Discogs

American country record producers
1922 births
1998 deaths
Country musicians from California
20th-century American singers
Impact Records (California) artists
London Records artists